Tomakin is a small seaside village on the south coast of New South Wales between the major towns of Batemans Bay and Moruya. It is most closely flanked by the other small villages of Guerilla Bay and Mossy Point (adjacent to Broulee which is separated by the Candalagan Creek).

The town is located at the mouth of the Tomaga River. It has a boat ramp which, along with another boat ramp at Mossy Point, provides access to the Pacific Ocean.

Tourist attractions
There are three caravan parks with on-site vans and cabins available. There are other accommodation options including bed and breakfast establishments and holiday cottages for rent.

Activities in the area include surfing, swimming, wind and kite surfing, fishing (beach, river, rock, estuary, ocean), kayaking, stand-up paddle boarding, walks and bicycling.

References

Towns in the South Coast (New South Wales)
Coastal towns in New South Wales
Eurobodalla Shire